Christine Wilhelmine Friederike von Grävenitz (born 4 February 1684, Schwerin – d. 21 October 1744, Berlin) was a German noblewoman who was the royal mistress to Eberhard Louis, Duke of Württemberg, between 1706 and 1731. The couple married in 1707, despite the fact that Eberhard thereby committed bigamy, being already married. From 1710, the couple lived in Ludwigsburg, while the wife of Eberhard Louis lived in Stuttgart. Grävenitz was politically active and was from 1717 until 1731 a full member of the secret government cabinet, which ruled the state. In 1731 the relationship was ended by Eberhard, and the year after, Grävenitz was given a pension and left Württemberg.

Early life
In particular, she was daughter of Hans Friedrich von Grävenitz (1637-1697), Hofmarschall of Mecklenburg-Güstrow and his wife, Dorothea Margarethe von Wendessen (d. 1718). Her sister Eleonore was a confidante of Sophia Louise, Queen of Prussia, while her brother  was a councilor to Eberhard Louis, Duke of Württemberg. As Friedrich Wilhelm had no roots in Württemberg, his career depended on the Duke's goodwill. To secure his position, he invited Wilhelmine to the court of Württemberg. Friedrich Wilhelm's desire to pair his sister with the Duke was supported by Hofmeister  and by Friedrich Wilhelm, Prince of nearby Hohenzollern-Hechingen. Their motives for that support are unknown, though their designs were frustrated when Wilhelmine contracted smallpox and her trip to Württemberg had to be delayed by a year.

Ducal mistress 
Wilheimine finally arrived in Württemberg in 1706, escorted by Staffhorst, and received from him the proper attire and accouterments for appearing at court. At the time, Eberhard Louis was pursuing a Madame von Geyling, but Wilhelmine and the Duke would eventually meet and began a relationship. She would not only replace von Geyling, but the Duke's legitimate wife, Duchess Johanna Elisabeth of Baden-Durlach. Eberhard Louis had no love for his wife and viewed his relationship with Wilhelmine as legitimate, but conducted his romance with her publicly and once forced her to respect another of the Duke's extramarital affairs.

In November 1731, Wilhelmine von Grävenitz was banished from the ducal court and her relationship with Eberhard Louis was terminated. In October 1731, she was arrested accused of having bewitched Eberhard Louis, and was imprisoned until she was finally released in 1733.

Citations

References

 
 
 

1684 births
1744 deaths
18th-century German people
Mistresses of German royalty
Morganatic spouses of German royalty
Witch trials in Germany